801 Live is the first live album by 801.  It was originally released by Island Records in the UK (cat. no. ILPS 9444) in November 1976. It was subsequently released by Polydor Records in North America (cat. no PD-1-6148) in March 1978.

In 1976, while guitarist Phil Manzanera's band Roxy Music was on hiatus, 801 got together as a temporary project and began rehearsing at Island Studios, Hammersmith, about three weeks before their first concert.

801 performed three concerts: in Norfolk, at the Reading Festival, and on 3 September at London's Queen Elizabeth Hall. The final concert was recorded and released as the album 801 Live. The music consisted of selections from albums by Phil Manzanera, Brian Eno and Quiet Sun, plus covers of The Beatles' "Tomorrow Never Knows" and The Kinks' "You Really Got Me". The album was one of the first in which all outputs from the vocal microphones, guitar amps and other instruments (except the drums) were fed directly to the mobile studio mixing desk, rather than being recorded via microphones and/or signals fed out the front-of-house PA mixer. It was successful in many countries, including Australia, where it was heavily promoted by the ABC's new 24-hour rock station Double Jay (2JJ).

In 2006, the official Phil Manzanera Web site Manzanera.com reported that 801 Live was soon to be reissued as a double CD with "minor tweaks" to the original recordings and restoration of the "proper ending" to the song "Third Uncle". In April 2011, Burning Shed announced the availability of the double CD under the title 801 Live Collectors Edition. Material for the second CD was taken from a 23 August 1976 studio rehearsal on a sound stage at Shepperton Film Studios.

Track listing

1976 LP track listing

Side One
"Lagrima" (Phil Manzanera) – 2:34
"TNK (Tomorrow Never Knows)" (John Lennon, Paul McCartney) – 6:14
"East of Asteroid" (Manzanera, Bill MacCormick) – 4:58
"Rongwrong" (Charles Hayward) – 5:10
"Sombre Reptiles" (Brian Eno) – 3:14

Side Two
"Baby's on Fire" (Eno) – 5:02
"Diamond Head" (Manzanera) – 6:21
"Miss Shapiro" (Manzanera, Eno) – 4:20
"You Really Got Me" (Ray Davies) – 3:23
"Third Uncle" (Eno) – 5:14

1999 Reissue (Collectors Edition)
"Lagrima" (Manzanera) – 2:33
"TNK (Tomorrow Never Knows)" (Lennon, McCartney) – 6:15
"East of Asteroid" (Manzanera, MacCormick) – 4:56
"Rongwrong" (Hayward) – 5:09
"Sombre Reptiles" (Eno) – 3:12
"Golden Hours" (Eno) – 4:30
"Fat Lady of Limbourg" (Eno) – 6:02
"Baby's on Fire" (Eno) – 5:02
"Diamond Head" (Manzanera) – 6:21
"Miss Shapiro" (Manzanera, Eno) – 4:21
"You Really Got Me" (Davies) – 3:22
"Third Uncle" (Eno) – 5:15

2009 Collectors Edition

Disc one: 3 September 1976 Queen Elizabeth Hall performance
"Lagrima" (Manzanera) – 2:19
"TNK (Tomorrow Never Knows)" (Lennon, McCartney) – 6:07
"East of Asteroid" (Manzanera, MacCormick) – 4:54
"Rongwrong" (Hayward) – 5:02
"Sombre Reptiles" (Eno) – 2:52
"Golden Hours" (Eno) – 4:33
"Fat Lady of Limbourg" (Eno) – 5:51
"Baby's on Fire" (Eno) – 4:59
"Diamond Head" (Manzanera) – 6:18
"Miss Shapiro" (Manzanera, Eno) – 4:18
"You Really Got Me" (Ray Davies) – 3:20
"Third Uncle" (Eno) – 5:12

Disc two: 23 August 1976 Shepperton Studios rehearsal
"Lagrima" (Manzanera) – 2:16
"TNK (Tomorrow Never Knows)" (Lennon, McCartney) – 6:46
"East of Asteroid" (Manzanera, MacCormick) – 4:46
"Rongwrong" (Hayward) – 5:43
"Sombre Reptiles" (Eno) – 3:56
"Fat Lady of Limbourg" (Eno) – 9:06
"Baby's on Fire" (Eno) – 5:21
"Diamond Head" (Manzanera) – 5:39
"Miss Shapiro" (Manzanera, Eno) – 3:56
"You Really Got Me" (Davies) – 3:02
"Third Uncle" (Eno) – 5:36
"Lagrima (Reprise)" (Manzanera) – 2:21

Charts

Personnel
Phil Manzanera – guitar
Lloyd Watson – slide guitar, vocals
Francis Monkman – Fender Rhodes piano, clavinet
Brian Eno – keyboards, vocals, synthesizers, guitar
Bill MacCormick – bass, vocals
Simon Phillips – drums, rhythm generator
Technical
Rhett Davies – engineer
Chris Michie – sound engineer
Richard Wallis – photography

References

External links
Live Double CD Nears Completion
801 Live: The Official Manzanera/Eno Press Pack
801 Live - reviews, articles, photographs and press
801 Live Catalogue Details
801 Live at Expression Records

801 (band) albums
1976 live albums
Island Records live albums
Polydor Records live albums